The 2016 Los Angeles County Board of Supervisors elections were held on June 7, 2016. Three of the five seats (for the Second, Fourth, and Fifth Districts) of the Los Angeles County Board of Supervisors were contested in this election. A run-off election was held for the Fourth and Fifth Districts on November 8, 2016, as no single candidate failed to reach a majority vote.

Michael D. Antonovich and Don Knabe, incumbent Supervisors for the Fourth and Fifth Districts respectively, were termed out.

Results

Second District

Fourth District

June 7, 2016 election

November 8, 2016 run-off election

Fifth District

June 7, 2016 election

November 8, 2016 run-off election

References

External links 
Los Angeles County Department of Registrar-Recorder/County Clerk

Los Angeles County Board of Supervisors
Los Angeles County Board of Supervisors elections
Los Angeles County